Wilfred Velásquez (born 10 September 1985) is a Guatemalan football midfielder.

He was part of the Guatemala national football team for the 2011 CONCACAF Gold Cup, and played in four matches.

References

1985 births
Living people
Guatemalan footballers
Guatemala international footballers
Association football midfielders
2009 UNCAF Nations Cup players
2011 Copa Centroamericana players
2011 CONCACAF Gold Cup players
2013 Copa Centroamericana players